Valjo Masso (3 June 1933 in Viljandi - 10 September 2013) is an Estonian agronomist and politician. He was a member of VIII Riigikogu.

References

1933 births
Estonian agronomists
Members of the Riigikogu, 1995–1999
Estonian University of Life Sciences alumni
People from Viljandi
2013 deaths